Corydoras paleatus is a species of catfish (order Siluriformes) of the family Callichthyidae. Its common names include blue leopard corydoras, mottled corydoras, and peppered catfish. It originates from the lower Paraná River basin and coastal rivers in Uruguay and Brazil.

Description
This fish species reach about 5.9 centimeters (2.3 in) SL. The male is smaller than the female, and in proportion to body length, the dorsal fin and pectoral fins are longer on the male than the female.

Ecology
Corydoras paleatus is found in the Amazon basin, and feeds on worms, crustaceans, insects, and plant matter.

C. paleatus has been known to produce sound; it does this by the abduction of its pectoral fins. This is used by males during courtship and intrapersonal communication, and by both sexes and juveniles when distressed.

In reproduction, males do not behave aggressively toward each other, nor do they monopolize mating areas or females. The T-position is involved in courtship, as with many other Corydoras species.

In the aquarium

It is a very good choice for the community aquarium, as it is a hardy, good-looking, and peaceful fish. They can be successfully kept with other small, peaceful aquarium fish like livebearers, danios, and tetras. It is sometimes seen in the shops as an albino form, although this is similar to other albino corys (see the C. aeneus albino form). It grows to around 7.5 cm and is easily bred at home.	

These fish prefer a planted tank with temperatures around 16 to 24 ° C (61 – 75 ° F), although they can take lower temperatures than this. Their high temperature tolerance seems poor, and 30 °C (86 °F) is the highest safe temperature. They like to nibble on the algae that grow on floating plants but are not specialized algae-eating catfish. The lighting must not be too bright, and hiding places, such as bogwood, are needed as they like to hide from the light during certain parts of the day. Heavily planted areas should also be provided, where the light is minimized, as they like darker areas due to their bottom-feeding nature.

Diet should be sinking pellets, algae wafers, frozen and live food, such as bloodworm or daphnia. They may also occasionally enjoy blanched spinach, which can be attached to plants with a peg or the side of the glass with magnetic clips. They can be seen to dart to the top of the tank: this is because they can use atmospheric oxygen to supplement what their gills extract from the water. They will do this more frequently  when water quality is starting to deteriorate, and so should be watched for this indication.

Breeding 
Peppered corydoras reach their sexual maturity and start to show reproductive behaviors once the females reach an average (minimum) size of 5.625 cm (2.214 inches) and once the males reach about 4.875 cm (1.919 inches). The males initiate the courtship ritual, which entails chasing the females around the tank. The female darts away, and the males search for her and find her a few moments later. The males shiver all over the female and may lie down on top of her. When she is ready to spawn, she turns to the male next to her and pounds below his ventral fin. The pair go into the "T-position" with the male releasing the sperm into the female's mouth before the sperm fertilizes the eggs. The female cups her ventral fins and lays a few eggs (usually between 4 and 12 eggs) in her fins.  The eggs are about 1.8 mm in diameter. The female now starts cleaning a spot on the glass to put her eggs on. Corydoras are egg depositors and lay their eggs all over the aquarium. Favorite spots include the heater, filters, and the glass, although, occasionally eggs are also laid on plants and driftwood.

After depositing a group of eggs closely together, the female rests for a few moments. The males regroup and start chasing each other and then resume chasing the female. The males are so relentless in this pursuit that they try to mate with the female even while she is busy laying her eggs. The spawning lasts more than an hour, and many eggs are laid in different places. On average, about 50 to 150 eggs are laid during a single spawning.

Raising the fry 

The incubation period for the eggs for peppered corydoras was found to be between 96 hours and 113 hours at 24±2°C, with the average incubation period being about 102 hours (or 4.25 days). In one study, the average hatching ratio of the eggs was found to be approximately 87%, with the overall egg-laying period lasting between 20 and 35 days. Peppered cories can eat their eggs, but will not eat the living fry.  At first, the fry is small (with a mean length of 7.5246 mm) and is unable to eat, sustaining themselves on the last of their yolk sacs. The fry will begin to eat 1-3 days after hatching, and will eat the protozoan organisms in the tank and can be fed powdered food at this stage.  By about one month, the fry will start to become rounder and will begin developing adult coloration, eventually becoming miniature versions of the adults. The juveniles will reach adult size at around 1 year of age, although this varies between individuals and how well they are kept. The age of sexual maturity also varies between individuals, but juveniles will typically begin breeding at around 8-12 months of age. However, they can begin as early as 6 months and as late as 18 months of age. From the onset of sexual maturity, it can take the fish up to another year to successfully produce fertile eggs; at first, entire clutches of eggs may be infertile. Albino strains may develop slower and be less fertile due to inbreeding.

See also
List of freshwater aquarium fish species
Siluriformes

References

Corydoras
Fish of South America
Fish described in 1842